Mount Morrison is an  mountain summit located in Custer County, Idaho, United States.

Description
Mount Morrison ranks as the 56th-highest peak in Idaho and is part of the Lost River Range which is a subset of the Rocky Mountains. The mountain is set on land managed by Salmon–Challis National Forest. Neighbors include White Cap Peak 2.6 miles southeast, line parent Mount Idaho, 1.2 mile east-northeast, and Borah Peak, the highest peak in Idaho, is 2.7 miles to the north-northeast. Precipitation runoff from the mountain's slopes drains to Big Lost River. This landform's unofficial toponym honors Lee Morrison, USGS topographer who mapped much of Idaho from 1924 through 1935. His calculations in 1929 discovered that an unnamed peak (which would become Borah Peak) was the highest in the state.

Climate
Based on the Köppen climate classification, Mount Morrison is located in an alpine subarctic climate zone with long, cold, snowy winters, and cool to warm summers. Winter temperatures can drop below −10 °F with wind chill factors below −30 °F.

See also
 List of mountain peaks of Idaho

Gallery

References

External links
 Mount Morrison: Idaho: A Climbing Guide
 Lee Morrison: Idaho: A Climbing Guide
 Mount Morrison: Climbingidaho.com

Mountains of Idaho
Mountains of Custer County, Idaho
North American 3000 m summits
Salmon-Challis National Forest